I Shouldn't Be Alive is a documentary television series made by Darlow Smithson Productions, a UK-based production company, that featured accounts of individuals or groups caught in life-threatening scenarios away from civilization in natural environments. The show aired on multiple networks in the United States, Canada, the United Kingdom, the Netherlands, Australia, New Zealand, India, Iran, Pakistan and South Africa.

The show was compiled using footage of interviews and graphic reenactments of the situation. The main focus of the show is the reenactment, with narration and commentary by the participant(s). Each episode also explained how the person(s) survived the ordeal against typical odds and outlined the decisions they had made that kept them alive.

Production 
The series premiered on the Discovery Channel on 28 October 2005. Season 3 also airs in high definition on HD Theater. All episodes can now be seen in HD on DirecTV, Dish Network, or Verizon Fios. The show airs on Channel 7 in Australia and on Channel 4 in the United Kingdom.

On 5 March 2007, the Discovery Channel canceled the series and made it part of the "Discovery Classics" series. The show was broadcast on the Science Channel starting in early 2008. It was picked up in 2010 by Animal Planet and new episodes started to air along with the old.

As of October 2012, production of the show is currently on hiatus. Though, reruns of I Shouldn't Be Alive continued to air weekdays at 10AM (Eastern) until 2014. As of February 2013, casting has occurred for the show through Animal Planet's website, however no new episodes have been produced.

Episodes

Season 1 (2005–06)

Season 2 (2006)

Season 3 (2010)

Season 4 (2010–11)

Season 5 (2011)

Season 6 (2011–12)

References

External links 
 
 

Episode list using the default LineColor
2005 American television series debuts
2006 American television series endings
2010 American television series debuts
2012 American television series endings
Discovery Channel original programming
Animal Planet original programming